The 13th Canadian Comedy Awards, presented by the Canadian Comedy Foundation for Excellence (CCFE), honoured the best live, television, film, and Internet comedy of 2011.  The ceremony was held at the Fairmont Royal York Hotel in Toronto, Ontario, on 26 August 2012 and was hosted by Alan Thicke.

Canadian Comedy Awards, also known as Beavers, were awarded in 26 categories. Winners in 5 categories were chosen by the public through an online poll and others were chosen by members of industry organizations.  The awards ceremony concluded the Canadian Comedy Awards Festival which ran from 23 to 26 August.

The TV series Michael: Tuesdays and Thursdays led with seven nominations followed by the bilingual film French Immersion with five.  They each won a Beaver for best male performance.  The big winner was Halifax-based comedy troupe Picnicface, which won three Beavers for their eponymous TV series and three for their debut film, Roller Town.  This ceremony also introduced the Phil Hartman Award which went to Jo-Anna Downey.

Festival and ceremony

The 13th Canadian Comedy Awards (CCA) was held in Toronto, Ontario.  The gala awards ceremony was held on 26 August 2012 in the Imperial Room of the Fairmont Royal York Hotel. The ceremony was produced by Gary Rideout, Jr. and hosted by Alan Thicke, a veteran actor who at that time was the honorary chair of Canadians Abroad, a group that organized Canadian events in Los Angeles.

Each nominee for Best TV Show had already been cancelled. This was played-up in a video inspired by Billy Crystal's Oscar montages, where Gavin Crawford visited the cancelled shows' empty sets, was faced with his own cancelled shows, and was replaced as CCA host by Thicke. Also entertaining at the ceremony were Seán Cullen and Colin Mochrie.

The awards ceremony concluded the four-day Canadian Comedy Awards Festival which ran from 23 to 26 August, showcasing performances by nominees at various Toronto venues. Many stand-ups also took part in a 27 August AltDotComedy Lounge show at The Rivoli.

Winners and nominees
Nominees were announced on 7 June 2012 in Toronto, and voting took place between 14 June and 29 July. Members of the Canadian public voted for the categories Canadian Comedy Person of the Year, Best TV Show, Best Film, Best Web Clip, Best Web Series, Best Podcast, and Best Radio Program or Clip, with industry members deciding the remaining categories. There was record participation, with 88% more public voting and 113% more industry members voting compared to 2011.

This year's ceremony introduced the Phil Hartman Award for "an individual who makes the Canadian comedy community better." The award went to long-time Toronto open-mic night host Jo-Anna Downey. Awards were also introduced for podcasts and web series, giving this ceremony more award categories than any previous year.

Winners are listed first and highlighted in boldface:

Multimedia

Live

Television

Film

Internet

Special Awards

Multiple wins
The following people, shows, films, etc. received multiple awards

Multiple nominations
The following people, shows, films, etc. received multiple nominations.

Footnotes

References

External links
Canadian Comedy Awards official website

Canadian Comedy Awards
Canadian Comedy Awards
Awards
Awards